Aglossa pulveralis is a species of snout moth in the genus Aglossa. It was described by George Hampson in 1900 and is known from Algeria.

References

Moths described in 1900
Pyralini
Endemic fauna of Algeria
Moths of Africa